Lucero En Vivo Auditorio Nacional is the second live album by Mexican singer Lucero, released on 26 September 2007 by EMI. It was recorded in Mexico City in the Auditorio Nacional during the promotion of her album Quiéreme Tal Como Soy on 25 March 2007. It was released in two different formats, one contained a double disc CD, and the other one, a double DVD format. The first disc, contains the Pop part of the concert, and the second one has the Mariachi part. The Concert was directed by her brother Antonio Hogaza León and Guillermo Gil.

Track listing
The album is composed by 23 songs in the CD format, divided into two discs, one for pop and the other one for rancheras. The DVD version contains 24 tracks and is divided also into two discs too, one of pop and the other of rancheras, the difference is a track called Son De La Negra that works as a break at the beginning of the second DVD.

Charts
On the October 1, 2007 issue of the AMPROFON Mexican Top 100, the album debuted at number 37. It reached #25 as peak position, staying for 10 weeks in the chart

References

Lucero (entertainer) live albums
2007 live albums
Albums recorded at the Auditorio Nacional (Mexico)